Davidson Historic District is a national historic district located at Davidson, Mecklenburg County, North Carolina. The district encompasses 394 contributing buildings, 2 contributing sites, and 2 contributing structures in the central business district and surrounding residential neighborhoods of Davidson and campus of Davidson College.  It was developed after 1837 and includes notable examples of Italianate, Greek Revival, and Gothic Revival style architecture.  Located in the district are the separately listed Eumenean Hall and Philanthropic Hall.  Other notable buildings include the Maxwell Chambers Building, Jackson Row (1928), Helper Hotel (1848), Johnston Grocery Store (1912), Southern Railway Depot (1897), Linden Cotton Factory (1890), Delburg Cotton Mills (1908), Davidson United Methodist Church (1908), Davidson College Presbyterian Church (1951), and Carnegie Library (1909).

It was added to the National Register of Historic Places in 2009.

References

Historic districts on the National Register of Historic Places in North Carolina
Italianate architecture in North Carolina
Greek Revival architecture in North Carolina
Gothic Revival architecture in North Carolina
Buildings and structures in Mecklenburg County, North Carolina
National Register of Historic Places in Mecklenburg County, North Carolina